Plants vs. Zombies is a video game franchise developed by PopCap Games, a subsidiary of Electronic Arts (EA). The series follows the affiliates of David "Crazy Dave" Blazing as they use his plants to defend against a zombie invasion, led by Dr. Edgar George Zomboss. The first game, Plants vs. Zombies (2009), was developed and released by PopCap before its acquisition by EA. After PopCap Games's acquisition, EA expanded the game into a franchise with games on many different platforms.

History

Main series
On April 1, 2009, PopCap released a music video for the song "Zombies on Your Lawn" to promote Plants vs. Zombies. A PopCap spokesperson, Garth Chouteau, revealed in an IGN interview that Plants vs. Zombies would be released soon on PC and Mac. On April 22, 2009, PopCap released an official game trailer of Plants vs. Zombies on YouTube. During the promotion of Plants vs. Zombies, PopCap released a demo version of the game that could be played for thirty minutes. Plants vs. Zombies was officially released on May 5, 2009, for PC and Mac. As of 2013, Plants Vs Zombies, refraining from a $2.99 gameplay, is now free to play on both IOS and Android devices. Critics on mobile devices give the game an average of 4.3-4.8 star rating. 

PopCap Games and its assets were bought by EA on July 12, 2011, for 750 million US dollars. Fifty employees were laid off in the Seattle studio of PopCap Games on August 21, 2012, to mark a switch of focus to mobile and social gaming.

On August 20, 2012, PopCap announced that they were working on a sequel to Plants vs. Zombies. Its release date would be set at late spring of 2013. However, the game's status was in doubt shortly after the announcement when the company went through a period of layoffs. 

In May 2013, PopCap Games released a trailer revealing a sequel to the first game, titled Plants vs. Zombies 2: It's About Time. The game was soft-launched for the iOS in Australia and New Zealand on July 10, 2013, and was officially released on August 14, 2013, as a freemium title. The game featured new locations and plants along with the addition of plant food, a power-up that can be used to enhance a plant for a short period and can either be bought using in-game currency or acquired by defeating zombies that are glowing green. Along with these new add ons, the game continues to make updates from time to time. According to EA News, the Arena, and Penny's Pursuit, which is a sequel within the game, has been one of their latest major updates, aside from all the mini add ons.

In July 2019, EA announced Plants vs. Zombies 3, another free-to-play mobile title in the series. It was launched in a pre-alpha state for Android in July 2019. The game soft-launched in February 2020 in the Philippines, Romania, and Ireland. It was then made unavailable in October 2020, becoming unplayable in November 2020. EA has plans to release an improved version of the game in the future. On September 7, 2021, Plants vs. Zombies 3 was soft-launched again with substantial changes, such as two-dimensional graphics and the return of the Sunflower as a plantable plant, having the same purpose in the previous iterations.

A film adaptation based on the franchise was pitched at DreamWorks Animation but cancelled.

PVZ3 Releases and cancellations

Spin-offs
A spin-off called Plants vs. Zombies Adventures was announced in March 2013 and was released on May 20, 2013 on Facebook. The game added new locations and new plants. It also had a gameplay feature in which the player had a limited amount of plants and had to grow more plants at an in-game farm. In July 2014, it was announced that Plants vs. Zombies Adventures would close on October 12, 2014.

Plants vs. Zombies: Garden Warfare was announced at E3 2013 as a multiplayer third-person shooter game made for PC and consoles. Plants vs. Zombies: Garden Warfare was released on February 25, 2014, in North America and on February 27, 2014, in Europe. A sequel, Plants vs. Zombies: Garden Warfare 2, was teased in June 2015 and was officially announced at E3 2015. The game was released on February 23, 2016. On March 10, 2016, PopCap announced Plants vs. Zombies Heroes, a digital collectible card game in the style of tower defense. It was soft released to certain countries on the same day, and was fully released internationally on October 18, 2016.

In August 2019, a closed beta of a sequel to Plants vs. Zombies: Garden Warfare 2 codenamed "Picnic" was made available to select players through invites. On September 4, 2019, EA announced the sequel's title; Plants vs. Zombies: Battle for Neighborville. It was released in an early access state that same date. The game was fully released on October 18, 2019.

A cancelled single player Plants vs. Zombies game had been in the works within EA from about 2015 to 2017. Known as "Project Hot Tub" in reference to Hot Tub Time Machine, the game was to have been an action game along the lines of the Uncharted series but maintaining its family-friendly nature, featuring two teenage siblings that travelled through time to fight zombies. The game was being developed by PopCap Vancouver. While a vertical slice of the game had been shown off to EA executives in 2017, EA opted to cancel the project to pull in more resources to Visceral Games to support their work on the Star Wars game under the name Project Ragtag, which had been languishing for several years. Despite this, EA cancelled Project Ragtag in October 2017, shutting down Visceral Games, and the former PopCap Vancouver team was relocated across other EA studios.

References

External links
Official website

 
Video game franchises introduced in 2009
PopCap games
Electronic Arts franchises